Carson Millar is a Saint Lucian professional football manager.

Career
Since 2004 until 2006 he coached the Saint Lucia national football team.

References

Year of birth missing (living people)
Living people
Saint Lucian football managers
Saint Lucia national football team managers
Place of birth missing (living people)